Mini language may refer to:
Domain-specific language, in computer languages
Kujargé language (unclassified)
Abureni language (Central Delta)